Thumbs Up is a hand gesture.

Thumbs Up may also refer to: 
Thumbs Up (film), a 1943  American musical drama
Thumbs Up! (musical), a 1934 musical revue
Thumbs Up (newspaper), a Chinese newspaper published in Singapore for school children
 "Thumbs Up", an episode of Rugrats
 "Thumbs Up" (song), by Momoland
Thumbs Up! (EP), by Pentagon
👍, U+1F44D from the Miscellaneous Symbols and Pictographs Unicode block

See also
Thums Up, an Indian carbonated drink
Two thumbs up, a trademark held by the Siskel and Ebert families from their film review television shows
Two Thumbs Up, an album by Tab Two
 Thumbs Down (film), a 1927 silent film directed by Phil Rosen